Elections to Carrickfergus Borough Council were held on 5 May 2011 on the same day as the other Northern Irish local government elections. The election used three district electoral areas to elect a total of 17 councillors.

There was no change from the prior election.

Election results

Note: "Votes" are the first preference votes.

Districts summary

|- class="unsortable" align="centre"
!rowspan=2 align="left"|Ward
! % 
!Cllrs
! % 
!Cllrs
! %
!Cllrs
! %
!Cllrs
!rowspan=2|TotalCllrs
|- class="unsortable" align="center"
!colspan=2 bgcolor="" | DUP
!colspan=2 bgcolor="" | UUP
!colspan=2 bgcolor="" | Alliance
!colspan=2 bgcolor="white"| Others
|-
|align="left"|Carrick Castle
|bgcolor="#D46A4C"|38.7
|bgcolor="#D46A4C"|2
|9.9
|1
|31.5
|1
|19.9
|1
|5
|-
|align="left"|Kilroot
|bgcolor="#D46A4C"|39.1
|bgcolor="#D46A4C"|3
|13.3
|1
|22.3
|1
|25.3
|1
|6
|-
|align="left"|Knockagh Monument
|bgcolor="#D46A4C"|50.3
|bgcolor="#D46A4C"|3
|22.1
|2
|24.9
|1
|2.7
|0
|6
|-
|- class="unsortable" class="sortbottom" style="background:#C9C9C9"
|align="left"| Total
|43.2
|8
|15.9
|4
|25.1
|3
|15.8
|2
|17
|-
|}

Districts results

Carrick Castle

2005: 2 x DUP, 1 x Alliance, 1 x UUP, 1 x Independent
2011: 2 x DUP, 1 x Alliance, 1 x UUP, 1 x Independent
2005-2011 Change: No change

Kilroot

2005: 3 x DUP, 1 x Alliance, 1 x UUP, 1 x Independent
2011: 3 x DUP, 1 x Alliance, 1 x UUP, 1 x Independent
2005-2011 Change: No change

Knockagh Monument

2005: 3 x DUP, 2 x UUP, 1 x Alliance
2011: 3 x DUP, 2 x UUP, 1 x Alliance
2005-2011 Change: No change

References

Carrickfergus Borough Council elections
Carrickfergus